Arkansas Highway 354 is a designation for two east–west state highways in north Arkansas. The western segment of  runs from Highway 9 in Oxford to Horseshoe Bend. An eastern segment of  runs east from U.S. Route 167 in Ash Flat to Arkansas Highway 58.

Route description

Oxford to Horseshoe Bend
The route begins at AR 9 in Oxford. The route runs east to Horseshoe Bend, where it terminates at AR 289. This segment of highway is named Cardinal Road, and passes through the unincorporated community of Wiseman.

Ash Flat to Highway 58
Highway 354 begins in Ash Flat at US 167, and runs east as Main Street. The route winds southeast through Center to meet Arkansas Highway 58, where it terminates. Highway 354 runs along the southern part of the Harold E. Alexander Wildlife Management Area.

Major intersections

|-
| colspan=6 align=center| Highway 354 eastern segment begins in Ash Flat
|-

See also

 List of state highways in Arkansas

References

External links

354
Transportation in Sharp County, Arkansas
Transportation in Izard County, Arkansas